Gungwe(Gongwe)  is a ward in Gwanda District of Matabeleland South province in southern Zimbabwe.It is under the jurisdiction of Headman Mogorosi who is under Chief Mathe who has authority over Bolamba area. The inhabitants are mostly the Babirwa.It is where the Chief's home is located. There is a secondary  and primary school, dam, dip-tank, a council hall, clinic, churches and several shops among the infrastructure. East of it is where the founding Vice-Chancellor of National University of Science and Technology Prof. Phineas Mogorosi Makhurane was born and have built his homestead. The place takes its name from the hill close to the dam. The bhungapunga river passes through the ward to empty is water in the Tuli river east of the location.

Wards of Zimbabwe
Gwanda District